Mulberry Street is a principal thoroughfare in Lower Manhattan, New York City. It is historically associated with Italian-American culture and history, and in the late 19th and early 20th centuries was the heart of Manhattan's Little Italy.

The street was listed on maps of the area since at least 1755. The "Bend" in Mulberry, where the street changes direction from southeast to northwest to a northerly direction, was made to avoid the wetlands surrounding the Collect Pond. During the period of the American Revolution, Mulberry Street was usually referred to as "Slaughter-house Street", named for the slaughterhouse of Nicholas Bayard on what is now the southwest corner of Mulberry and Bayard Streets, which was located there until the summer of 1784, when it was ordered to be removed to Corlaer's Hook.

Mulberry Bend, formed by Mulberry Street on the east and Orange Street on the west, was historically part of the core of the infamous Five Points; the southwest corner of Mulberry Bend formed part of the Five Points intersection for which the neighborhood was named.  Aside from Mulberry, the other four streets forming Five Points were Anthony Street (now Worth Street), Cross Street (now Mosco Street), Orange Street (Baxter Street), and Little Water Street (which no longer exists).

Location
Mulberry is located between Baxter and Mott Streets. It runs north to south, through the centers of Little Australia and Little Italy, parallel to Mott Street one block to the east, and is bound on the north by Bleecker Street in NoHo and on the south by Worth Street in the Civic Center. Near the southern portion of Mulberry Street, the street enters Chinatown, where the street is lined with Chinese green grocers, butcher stores, and fish mongers.

Further south past Bayard Street, on the west side of the street, lies Columbus Park, that was created in 1897.  The south-west corner of the park (away from Mulberry Street) is the site of the original Five Points intersection. The east side of the street is now lined with Chinatown's funeral homes.

Mulberry Bend

The street was named after the mulberry trees that once lined Mulberry Bend, the slight bend in Mulberry Street. "Mulberry Bend is a narrow bend in Mulberry Street, a tortuous ravine of tall tenement-houses... so full of people that the throngs going and coming spread off the sidewalk nearly to the middle of the street... The crowds are in the street because much of the sidewalk and all of the gutter is taken up with vendors' stands."

For the urban reformer Jacob Riis, Mulberry Bend epitomized the worst of the city's slums: "A Mulberry Bend Alley" contrasted with "Mulberry Bend becomes a park" were two of the photographs illustrating Jacob Riis's call for renewal, The Battle with the Slum (1902). In response to reformers such as Riis, the city in the 1890s bought out many of the slumlords and replaced tenements with Columbus Park.

Notable buildings
The Puck Building stands near the north end of the street on the southwest corner of Houston Street. Further south is Saint Patrick's Old Cathedral, standing in its churchyard. Church of the Most Precious Blood, at 113 Baxter Street, was built by Italians, who as new immigrants were not allowed to worship in the main Churches of Transfiguration nor St. Patrick's Old Cathedral. Below Prince Street (no, 247) is the former Ravenite Social Club, where wire taps acquired evidence that sent John Gotti to prison.

An Italian-American Museum is at 155 Mulberry and Grand Street.

Culture

Social structure
The New York Times sent its reporters to characterize the Little Italy/Mulberry neighborhood in May 1896:

They are laborers; toilers in all grades of manual work; they are artisans, they are junkman, and here, too, dwell the rag pickers....There is a monster colony of Italians who might be termed the commercial or shop keeping community of the Latins. Here are all sorts of stores, pensions, groceries, fruit emporiums, tailors, shoemakers, wine merchants, importers, musical instrument makers....There are notaries, lawyers, doctors, apothecaries, undertakers.... There are more bankers among the Italians than among any other foreigners except the Germans in the city.

Feast of San Gennaro

During the Italian-American festival of the Feast of San Gennaro each September, the entire street is blocked off to vehicular traffic for the street fair. The San Gennaro Feast began in 1926 and continues . It is the largest Italian-American Festival in New York and possibly the United States.

In popular culture
Manhattan's Mulberry Street has been the subject of books, films, and music. For example:

Books
The King of Mulberry Street, by Donna Jo Napoli. A young boy in the 1890s travels alone from Napoli (Naples), Italy to New York, where he settles on Mulberry Street.

Films
In the movie Donnie Brasco (1997), the character "Lefty" (based on real-life gangster Lefty Ruggiero and played by Al Pacino) says: "... ask anybody, anybody, about Lefty, from Mulberry Street ..."
In the film Gangs of New York (2002), the character Bill the Butcher refers to Mulberry Street as one of the five streets forming the Five Points intersection.
Music
Billy Joel's song "Big Man on Mulberry Street" is a jazz influenced song from his album The Bridge (1986). 
The street is also named in the song "Io tengo n'appartamento" by the Italian singer Renato Carosone: an old story of a rich singer in Little Italy missing his hometown Napoli. 
The Italian-American hip-hop group Lordz of Brooklyn mentions Mulberry Street in their song "The Bad Racket", talking about a Mafia "sit-down" on Mulberry Street.
Twenty One Pilots' "Mulberry Street" from their album Scaled And Icy
Television
In Season 4 of Sex and the City, Aiden and Steve open a bar on Mulberry Street.
The Alienist, Season 1, Episode 2 talks about Mulberry Street.
 In Season 1, Episode 10 of The Sopranos, Mulberry Street is mentioned.

References

Further reading

External links

New York Songlines: Mulberry Street, a virtual walking tour
Mulberry Street Storefronts - photographs of buildings and stores along Mulberry St from Chinatown through Little Italy

See also
Mulberry (disambiguation)
Mulberry Street (disambiguation)

Five Points, Manhattan
Streets in Manhattan
Italian-American culture in New York City
Little Italys in the United States
Lower East Side
Chinatown, Manhattan